Vlastimil Lejsek (21 July 1927 in Brno – 12 March 2010 in Brno) was a Czech composer and pianist.

Biography
Lejsek was the son of the Moravian choirmaster Frantisek Kvetoslav Lejsek. He studied at the Brno Conservatory and the Academies of Music in both Prague and Brno with Frantisek Schafer, Jan Erml and František Maxián. During his studies he received awards at many competitions, such as the International Smetana Competition (Prague) and Franz Liszt Competition (Budapest).

With his wife, Vera Lejskova, he established a famous piano duo, collaborating with composers such as Milhaud, Britten, Lutoslawski and Shostakovich, and recording for the first time Dvořák's 4-hand works and many more. As a solo pianist, he premiered many works of his colleagues, as well as of his own.
 
The main body of his musical output consists music for piano duo (like Brazilian Dances, Dances of Masters, Inventions, Moravian Ballades) and piano solo (Preludes, Sonatella, Pianists and Horses, The Moon Suite).

Besides being a composer and a performing and recording pianist, Lejsek also served at the music faculties of the Conservatory and Janáček Academy of Music in Brno. He was a member of Moravian Composer's Club (founded by Janáček) and also founder of the International Schubert Competition for Piano duos in Jesenik (Czech republic), one of the foremost music events of his country.

His wife is, besides a pianist, a writer, journalist and critic working for both press and radio. Together they were an important and inspiring couple in Czech musical life. Their life and work is depicted in the book "Interviews without piano" by Jan Trojan.

Selected works
Opera
 Noc s Kobr a Štejnem, Rejvízská opera (Rejvíz Opera) for soloists, chorus, piano 4 hands and percussion (1976)

Orchestral
 Stříbrný pochod (Silver March) for wind orchestra (1977); original for piano 4 hands
 Lozíbecký pochod (March from Lozíbek) (1981, 1986); original for piano 4 hands

Concertante
 Brazilské tance (Brazilian Dances) for piano and orchestra (1961, 1990); original for 2 pianos
 Preludia (Preludes) for piano and orchestra (1975, 1985); original for piano solo

Chamber music
 Dvě skladby (2 Pieces) for viola and piano (1959)
 Allegro giocoso for flute and piano (1961)
 Dvě malá dua (2 Little Duos) for violin and piano (1967)
 Na Rejvízu (In Rejviz) for recorder, timpani and piano (1975)
 Duo con brio for clarinet and piano (1979)
 Sonatella for trumpet and piano (1983)
 Preludium, taneček a chorál (Prelude, Little Dance and Choral) for 2 trombones and piano (1983)

Piano solo
 Pět epigramů (5 Epigrams) (1965)
 Ochozská polka (Polka from Ochoz) (1961, 1966); original for 2 pianos
 Sonatina in C (1967)
 Preludia (Preludes) (1975); also for piano and orchestra
 Sešit for Věrku (Book for Věra) (1976)
 Měsíční svita (Moon Suite) (1976)
 Pianisté a koně (Pianists and Horses) (1977)
 Sonatella (1978)
 Espressivo (1983)
 Roční doby (Seasons) (1983)
 Kovbojská svita (Cowboy Suite) (1990)
 21 reminiscencí klavírního vysloužilce (21 Reminiscences of a Piano Veteran) (1990)
 Písnička ze sklepa (Cellar Songs) (1996)

Piano 4 hands
 Duettina (Duettinos) for piano 4 hands (1966)
 Sonatina for piano 4 hands (1966)
 Duettinka (Little Duettinos) for piano 4 hands (1975)
 Suita z opery Noc s Kobr a Štejnem (Suite from the Opera "Noc s Kobr a Štejnem") (1976)
 Tanec, Serenáda pro Dr. Trojana a Variace (Dance, Serenade for Dr. Trojana and Variation) (1976)
 Quattutor ludibria for piano 4 hands and pipe (1977)
 Stříbrný pochod (Silver March) for piano 4 hands (1977); also orchestrated
 Sonata divertimenta for piano 4 hands (1979)
 Třikrát for dva (Thrice for Two) (2002)
 Dueta (Duets) (1981)
 Pět krátkých tanců (Five Short Dances) (1981)
 Čtverlístek (Quatrefoil) (1983); also for piano 6 hands
 Sonatinka (Little Sonatina) (1983)
 Lozíbecký pochod (March from Lozíbek) (1981); also for orchestra
 Balady z Moravy (Ballads from Moravia) (1991)

Piano 6 hands
 Čtverlístek (Quatrefoil) (1983); original for piano 4 hands

2 Pianos
 Brazilské tance (Brazilian Dances) (1961); orchestrated in 1990
 Ochozská polka (Polka from Ochoz) (1961); also for piano solo
 Invence (Invention) (1962)
 Malá suita (Little Suite) (1962)
 Sonata (1966)
 Toccata in memoriam František Schäfer (1966)
 Orchestys eni orchato for 2 pianos and tape (1966)
 Tanečky mistrů (Masters' Little Dances) (1976)
 Divertimento (1977)
 Svita pro Lipník (Suite for Lipník) (1991)

2 Pianos 8 hands
 Suita domestica for 2 pianos 8 hands (1977)
 Tři věci (3 Movements) for 2 pianos 8 hands (1979)

Vocal
 Dua pro manžele Škrabalovy (Duos for Mrs. Škrabalová) for soprano and bassoon (1967)
 Čtyň slovácké písničky (4 Slovacko Songs) for voice and piano (1977)
 Dvě povídačky (Two Tales) for voice and piano (1978); words by Věra Lejsková
 Na hudební nástroje, hádej, kdo nám zahraje (Guess Who Will Play the Musical Instruments) for voice and piano (1981); words by Věra Lejsková
 Dvé písní z Moravy (2 Songs from Moravia) for voice and piano (1983); words by the composer

Choral
 Co všechno musí udělat jaro for children's chorus and piano (1966); words by František Halas
 Řikadla naučná (Educational Nursery Rhymes) for children's chorus and piano (1975); words by Věra Lejsková

References
 Lejsek's biography at http://www.pianosociety.com

External links
 Vlastimil Lejsek at the Czech Music Information Centre
 A recording of Lejsek's "Moon Suite"

1927 births
2010 deaths
Czech pianists
Classical piano duos
Franz Liszt Academy of Music alumni
Musicians from Brno
Brno Conservatory alumni